Doraville is a city in DeKalb County, Georgia, United States northeast of Atlanta. As of the 2020 census, the city had a population of 10,623.

History
Doraville was incorporated by an act of the Georgia General Assembly, approved December 15, 1871. From its development until the 1940s, Doraville was a small agricultural community that served the interests of a larger surrounding farming area.

At the end of World War II, Doraville was on a main railroad line and had a new water system. General Motors selected Doraville for a new assembly plant. Doraville grew in the late 1940s and the 1950s as a result. In the late 1940s, plans for Guilford Village, the first subdivision, were announced by Southern Builders and Engineering Company. The 112-home subdivision at Tilly Mill and Flowers Roads was to cover some 58 acres. In 1950, Doraville's population was 472. By 1964, its population was 6,160 and its land area was 1,722 acres. Part of the population growth during that period was because of the annexation of Northwoods in 1949 and Oakcliff in 1958.

By the 1980s, Doraville and neighboring Chamblee attracted immigrants relocating to the Atlanta area who settled along Buford Highway. The result is one of the largest Asian communities in the country. Many Latin American countries are also represented. 56% of residents speak a language other than English as a first language. The Doraville MARTA Station was built in 1992, destroying the few buildings that remained of Doraville's downtown. The GM Doraville Assembly Plant closed in 2009 and was demolished in 2015.

Geography
Doraville is located at  (33.905302, -84.273870). Doraville is northeast of Chamblee, southeast of Dunwoody, southwest of Norcross and Peachtree Corners, and northwest of Tucker.

Crooked Creek, a tributary of the Chattahoochee River, runs through Doraville.

The City of Doraville is located in DeKalb County. It has a humid subtropical climate (Cfa) and average monthly high temperatures range from 53° F in January to 90° F in July.

Demographics

2020 census

As of the 2020 United States census, there were 10,623 people, 3,231 households, and 2,026 families residing in the city.

2000 census
As of the census of 2000, there were 9,862 people, 2,998 households, and 1,981 families residing in the city. The racial makeup of the city was 46.35% White, 14.77% African American, 1.28% Native American, 12.67% Asian, 0.16% Pacific Islander, 20.62% from other races, and 4.14% from two or more races. Hispanic or Latino people of any race were 43.44% of the population.

There were 2,998 households, out of which 32.5% had children under the age of 18 living with them, 43.6% were married couples living together, 13.4% had a female householder with no husband present, and 33.9% were non-families. 21.8% of all households were made up of individuals, and 5.3% had someone living alone who was 65 years of age or older. The average household size was 3.24 and the average family size was 3.62.

In the city, the population was spread out, with 23.6% under the age of 18, 14.9% from 18 to 24, 38.7% from 25 to 44, 16.4% from 45 to 64, and 6.4% who were 65 years of age or older. The median age was 30 years. For every 100 females, there were 127.7 males. For every 100 females age 18 and over, there were 134.3 males.

The median income for a household in the city was $40,641, and the median income for a family was $41,903. Males had a median income of $23,681 versus $22,165 for females. The per capita income for the city was $15,048. About 9.6% of families and 15.3% of the population were below the poverty line, including 15.8% of those under age 18 and 9.3% of those age 65 or over.

Economy

Since the closure of the GM Assembly Plant, Doraville's economy has carried on with a mix of small, medium businesses.  Many small ethnic restaurants can be found along Buford Highway and Peachtree Industrial Blvd. Doraville is the corporate home of Serta Simmons Bedding.

Government
Doraville has a council–manager government, consisting of a city manager, city council, and mayor. The city is organized into three districts, with each district electing two city council members. Doraville also has a municipal court with authority over moving violations and local ordinances.

The current city manager is Chris Eldridge and the current mayor is Joseph Geierman. Geierman began his term in 2020 after serving on the Doraville City Council. Geierman is the first openly LGBT Mayor of Doraville and the fourth openly LGBT mayor in Georgia.

Architecture
Doraville has three distinct neighborhoods that all have a variety of post World War 2 styles. Northwoods has bungalow, mid-century, and split-level styles. Oakcliff has primarily 1960's ranch-style and split-level architecture. The oldest neighborhood is Tilly Mill where bungalow and ranch styles are prevalent. Modern infill homes have been built in Northwoods and Tilly Mill neighborhoods.

Education

Primary and secondary schools
DeKalb County School District serves Doraville and includes the following elementary schools:
Cary Reynolds Elementary School (Brookhaven)
Chesnut Elementary School (Dunwoody)
Hightower Elementary School (Doraville)
Huntley Hills Elementary School (Chamblee)
Doraville United Elementary (Doraville) 

Middle schools include:
Chamblee Middle School (Chamblee)
Peachtree Charter Middle School (Dunwoody)
Sequoyah Middle School (Doraville)

High schools serving sections of Doraville include:
 Chamblee Charter High School (Chamblee)
 Cross Keys High School (Brookhaven)
 Dunwoody High School (Dunwoody)

Public libraries
The City of Doraville operates its own library, in addition to providing local educational programing, in collaboration with DeKalb County.

Transportation

Major roads and expressways

Mass transit
For mass transit, the city is served by the Doraville MARTA station and is connected to the Gwinnett County Transit system.

Pedestrians and cycling
Doraville has an older sidewalk network.  Beginning in 2016 the city increased work repairing older sidewalks and installing new sidewalk segments.

Parks
The Doraville Parks and Recreation Department Manages a variety of facilities, including Honeysuckle Park, Fleming Arena, the Paul Murphy Boxing Club, Autumn Park, Brook Park, Chicopee Park, English Oak Park, Flowers Park and Bernard Halpern Park.

Notable people

 Atlanta Rhythm Section, 1970s Southern rock/adult contemporary band, formed in Doraville at Studio One recording studio.  The band's first top 40 hit, “Doraville”, peaked at #35 on the Billboard charts in 1974. "Doraville" was an uptempo song from the Third Annual Pipe Dream album which paid tribute to the friendly environment of the Atlanta suburb. The town was described in the 1974 song as "a touch of country in the city." Their 1980 album was titled The Boys from Doraville.

References

External links
 
 City of Doraville
 City-Data.com - comprehensive statistical data and more about Doraville
 Doraville Life online magazine
 Doraville.com - local business directory

 
Cities in Georgia (U.S. state)
Cities in DeKalb County, Georgia
Doraville
Populated places established in 1871
1871 establishments in Georgia (U.S. state)